Lino António da Conceição (26 November 1898 – 23 October 1974) was a Portuguese artist known for his Modernist paintings. He made many friezes, frescos, stained glass and ceramic panels for public buildings and private collections in Portugal. He taught in several schools and was director for many years at the Escola Secundária Artística António Arroio (António Arroio Secondary Arts School) in Lisbon, having an influence over hundreds of artists, mostly painters and designers.

Life

Lino António da Conceição was born in Leiria on 26 November 1898.
His parents were Lino António da Conceição and Maria do Carmo Pereira Dias da Conceição.
He had two older sisters and two younger sisters.
He spent time in the studio of his teacher and friend Narciso Costa.
He took a course in Ornamental Design at the Industrial School of Domingos Sequeira in Leiria, then attended the Lisbon School of Fine Arts, where he was a brilliant student.
On 1 October 1915 he enrolled at the Porto School of Fine Arts, where he studied under João Marques de Oliveira.

By 1917 António  was attending the "modernist gatherings" of Porto students described by the sculptor Diogo de Macedo, often held in the Excelsior café.
In 1918 he organized his first solo exhibition, in Leiria, where he showed his decorative style and modernist technique. He became port of a group that included the future architect António Varela, the artist Luís Fernandes, the poet Américo Durão and the doctor and writer Américo Cortez Pinto.
António married Maria Helena de Noronha Tudela in the 1920s, and they had three children.
His 1924 exhibition in Lisbon at the National Society of Fine Arts (SNBA) was praised by Contemporânea and Athena.
His work at this show included the themes of coastal people, Nazareth and urban living to which he returned throughout his career.
In the years that followed he participated in numerous exhibitions, made friezes, frescoes, stained glass and ceramic panels for various public buildings and illustrated several books.

António taught in the General Industrial and Commercial School of Marinha Grande, and then became a professor of mechanical design in the Machado de Castro Industrial School in Lisbon.
By the end of the 1930s he was obtaining public orders for his work, which allowed him to live fairly comfortably.
He was quoted as saying "Praise? I preferred an commission!"
He began to teach at the Antonio Arroyo School of Decorative Arts in 1940.
Among his students was the painter, sculptor and poet Figueiredo Sobral.
He became director of the school in 1953 and overhauled the curriculum to include fine arts, lithography, decorative painting, sculpture and pottery, carving and artistic furniture.
He was forced to retire due to his age in 1968.
In 1974 he suffered a stroke while working in his studio, and died in hospital two days later on 23 October 1974.

Work

Lino António was representative of the second generation of modernist artists.
He liked vibrant colors and robust forms. His paintings show a strong sense of decoration.
He explored themes of fishing, religion and history in his panels and frescoes.
In his later years he devoted himself to stained glass, mosaic and ceramic.

Exhibitions
António participated in over forty Salons and exhibitions, including:
Modernist Salon (1919, 1926); 
Salão de Outono (Salon of Autumn, 1925, 1926); 
Ibero-American Exposition in Seville (1929 – medal of honor); 
Salon of Independents (1930, 1931); 
National Society of Fine Arts (1924, 1930, 1932, 1933, 1958, 1973); 
Colonial Exhibition in Paris (1931 – medal of honor); 
Salon of Winter (1932); Lisbon Festival (1934 – decorations); 
SNi Exhibition (1935);
Exhibition of Year X of the National Revolution (1936); 
XXI Biennale di Venezia / Biennial of Venice (1938); 
Exhibition of Showcases (1940)
Portuguese World Exhibition (1940)
SPN Modern Art Exhibition (1943, 1944)
SNI Exhibition of Polychromatic Ceramic Panels (1955)
São Paulo Art Biennial(1951)
Art Portugais, Paris (1968)

Public works
Antonio made friezes, frescoes, stained glass and ceramic panels for various public buildings, including:
1924: Bristol Club remodeling 
1938: Frieze for the room of the President of the National Assembly
1938: Frescoes of the triumphal arch and the balcony of the choir of the Church of Our Lady of Fatima
1945: Stained glass windows for the Casa do Douro 
1946(?): Stained glass windows for the Jeronimos Monastery 
1946: Stained glass windows for the chapel of the Colégio das Escravas do Sagrado Coração de Jesus
1949: Frescos and stained glass for the Municipal Chamber of Vila Franca de Xira
1951: Frescos for the Church of Santo Eugénio in the Bairro of Encarnação
1952: Ceramic panels for the main lobby of the National Laboratory of Civil Engineering
1955: Ceramic panels for Fatima Sanctuary
1957: Frescos for the Great |Hall of the Municipality of Covilha
1957: Ceramic panel for the Faculty of Law, University of Lisbon
1958: Ceramic panel for the Pavilion of the Student Body of the Military Academy 
1958: Panel and ceramic frieze for the Institute of Hygiene and Tropical Medicine
1961: Stained glass windows and the Grand Portico of the Aula Magna;
1966: Frescos for the main lobby of the National Library. 
1966: Stained glass windows of the Seia Courthouse

Illustrations
Illustrations included:
1928 Illustrations and a cover for the magazine Civilização.
1938 Illustrations for the book Amadis by Afonso Vieira Lopes
1939 Illustrations for the book La Jeunesse Portugaise à l'École by António Mattoso.
1943 Illustrations for the book Life of Jesus by Pliny Salgado (Rocha Cabral prize).
Most of the books he illustrated were of the poet Sebastiao da Gama and Americo Cortezão

Notes

Sources

 

 

1898 births
1974 deaths
People from Leiria
20th-century Portuguese painters
20th-century Portuguese male artists
Portuguese male painters